Maniltoa vestita is a species of plant in the family Fabaceae. It is found only in Fiji.

References

vestita
Near threatened plants
Endemic flora of Fiji
Taxonomy articles created by Polbot
Taxobox binomials not recognized by IUCN